Pierre Mathé (1882-1956) was a French farmer and agrarian conservative politician.

Early life
Pierre Mathé was born on 1 August 1882 in Giry, rural France.

Career
Mathé joined the French Agrarian and Peasant Party, an agrarian conservative political party, and became its President. He served as a member of the  Chamber of Deputies for the Côte-d'Or from 1936 to 1942.

He co-authored Le manifeste paysan: essai d'une doctrine humaniste appliquée à l'agriculture française with François de Clermont-Tonnerre, published in 1937.

Death
He died on 3 June 1956 in Paris, France.

References

1882 births
1956 deaths
People from Nièvre
Politicians from Bourgogne-Franche-Comté
French Agrarian and Peasant Party politicians
Members of the 16th Chamber of Deputies of the French Third Republic